Nombarathi Poovu is a 1987 Malayalam drama film, written and directed by P. Padmarajan. It stars Madhavi, Baby Sonia, Mammootty, Shari and Unnimary. It focuses on the relationship between Gigi (Sonia) and Padmini (Madhavi). Its songs were composed by M. G. Radhakrishnan, while the background score was done by Johnson.

Plot
The movie shows how a young woman, Padmini, who is separated from her husband, becomes attached to an orphan girl, Gigi, she meets while they are hospitalised after a bus accident. Gigi lost her mother in the accident and Padmini decides to take Gigi with her. Gigi is not completely mentally stable and is a special needs child. Padmini brings Gigi to Dr. Padmanabhan, who after initial apprehension accepts Gigi in his institute as a student by day. Gigi gradually improves and Padmini is peaceful. Padmini's separated husband, Sethu still tries to win her back. Padmini had separated from her husband because she lost her children due to an episode of reckless motorcycle riding from her husband. Padmini decides to return to Sethu and adopt Gigi as their daughter. However, Gigi's special behavior annoys Sethu and Gigi starts to feel insecure about losing her mother again. The movie goes on to show Padmini's emotional turbulence.

In the end, Gigi 'plays' hide and seek with Padmini in the forest who tries to find her. Unfortunately, Gigi goes deeper in the forest and goes missing and leaves her doll. Padmanabhan reveals that Gigi has died. While, Padmini mourns over her daughter's loss.

Cast
 Madhavi as Padmini
 Sonia as Gigi
 Mammootty as Dr. Padmanabhan   
 Shari as Anitha 
 Unnimary as Joycee 
 Lalu Alex as Sethu 
 Jagathi Sreekumar as Sebastian 
 Murali as Samuel 
 Kundara Johnny
 Vinduja Menon as Shanthi

Production
Padmarajan had initially decided to cast Shabana Azmi in the lead role of Padmini. For this, Padmarajan and producer Gandhimati Balan made a visit to Shabana's home in Juhu, Bombay. They spent time with Shabana's father and poet Kaifi Azmi. They realised Shabana had made inquiries about Padmarajan and Gandhimati and was eager to work with them. The three sat down to script reading. After the reading, Shabana agreed to do the role, but on one condition, that the Malayalam dialogues be reduced and prominence given to her expressions. Padmarajan immediately closed his script notebook and apologised to Shabana that it would not be possible.

Award
 Kerala State Film Award for Best Child Artist for Baby Sonia

References

External links 
 

1987 films
1980s Malayalam-language films
Films with screenplays by Padmarajan
Films scored by Johnson
Films scored by M. G. Radhakrishnan
Films directed by Padmarajan